The 2012 United States presidential election in Alaska took place on November 6, 2012, as part of the 2012 United States presidential election in which all 50 states plus the District of Columbia participated. Alaska voters chose three electors to represent them in the Electoral College via a popular vote pitting incumbent Democratic President Barack Obama and his running mate, Vice President Joe Biden, against Republican challenger and former Massachusetts Governor Mitt Romney and his running mate, Congressman Paul Ryan.

Prior to the election, 17 news organizations considered this a state Romney would win, or otherwise considered as a safe red state. Romney won the state of Alaska with 54.80% of the vote, while Obama received 40.81%. This was the first time since 1968 that a Democrat received more than 40% of the vote in Alaska. No Democrat has won Alaska since it was won by Lyndon B. Johnson in 1964. While Romney handily won its three electoral votes, it was one of six states to swing toward Obama relative to 2008, when Alaska was won with a 21.5% margin of victory by Republican nominee John McCain running with the incumbent Governor of Alaska, Sarah Palin, as his vice-presidential candidate. Obama closed his margin of defeat by 7.55% compared to his 2008 loss, thereby making it the state with the strongest Democratic gain in 2012. 

He also flipped seven boroughs and census areas he had lost in 2008. He won North Slope Borough for the first time since 1992. This is the most recent election in which Haines Borough voted for the Republican candidate.

Caucuses

Democratic caucuses
The Alaska Democratic caucuses were held from April 10 to 14, 2012, with the state party convention being held from May 11 to 13. Precincts within House Districts combined to hold caucuses to pledge delegates to the State Convention. Obama ran mostly unopposed (with the exception of Randall Terry, who was on the ballot but received no votes) and consequently received all of the 500 popular votes and 24 delegates.

Republican caucuses

The Alaska Republican caucuses were held Super Tuesday, March 6, 2012. The presidential preference poll portion of the caucuses was scheduled between 4 pm and 8 pm local time (which is 8 pm to midnight EST) at locations across the state and one caucus in Washington, D.C.

Similar to the 2012 Nevada caucuses, the results of the presidential preference poll will be used to directly and proportionately apportion 24 national convention delegates among the candidates. Another 3 super delegates are unbound and not determined by the caucus results.

General election

Candidate ballot access
 Barack Obama/Joseph Biden, Democratic
 Mitt Romney/Paul Ryan, Republican
 Gary Johnson/James P. Gray, Libertarian
 Jill Stein/Cheri Honkala, Green
Write-in candidate access
 Rocky Anderson/Luis J. Rodriguez, Justice

Results

Boroughs and census areas that flipped from Republican to Democratic 

 Aleutians West Census Area (largest city: Unalaska)
 Dilingham Census Area (largest city: Dilingham)
 Lake & Peninsula Borough (largest city: Newhalen)
 North Slope Borough (largest city: Utqiaġvik)
 Northwest Arctic Borough (largest city: Kotzebue)
 Prince of Wales–Hyder Census Area (largest city: Craig)
 Yukon–Koyukok Census Area (largest city: Fort Yukon)

Results by Congressional District
Alaska has an at-large congressional equivalent to the statewide results.

See also
List of 2012 United States presidential electors
2012 United States presidential election
2008 United States presidential election in Alaska
2012 Democratic Party presidential primaries
2012 Republican Party presidential primaries
Alaska Democratic Party
Alaska Republican Party
United States presidential elections in Alaska

References

External links
 The Green Papers: for Alaska
 The Green Papers: Major state elections in chronological order
 Official website of the Alaska Republican Party
 Official website of the Alaska Democratic Party

Alaska
United States President
2012